The Connecticut Mastery Test, or CMT, is a test administered to students in grades 3 through 8. The CMT tests students in mathematics, reading comprehension, writing, and science (science was administered in March 2008). The other major standardized test administered to schoolchildren in Connecticut is the Connecticut Academic Performance Test, or CAPT, which is given in grade 10. Until the 2005–2006 school year, the CMT was administered in the fall; now it is given in the spring.

The CMT is graded on a scale from 1 to 5 in each area, on this scale: 
5 - "Advanced" 
4 - "Goal" 
3 - "Proficient" 
2 - "Basic"
1 - "Below basic."

Structure

Editing and Revising
This is the first portion of the CMT writing test. Students read passages that contain numerous spelling and grammar errors. After reading, they will answer multiple choice questions to correct the errors. This test is sixty minutes long and it is scored by a computer.

Direct Assessment of Writing
In this test, students have 45 minutes to write a paper on a designated topic. In third and fourth grade, the essay is a fictional narrative; in fifth and sixth it is an expository piece; in seventh and eighth grade it is a persuasive essay. It is scored by two trained professionals. Each reader scores it from one to six. The two scores are combined to make one total score, the state target goal is 8.0 out of 12.

Degrees of Reading Power
Also known as the DRP, this is the first portion of the reading section. Students must read through passages which have blanks in them. They must then choose the correct answer to fill in the blank from a choice of options. Students must fill in 49 answers (seven questions per passage, seven passages) in the DRP section of the test booklets. The questions gradually get harder as the students go on. The test is 45 minutes long and is put through a machine.

Reading Comprehension
This test requires students to read four passages and answer questions about what they just read. There are multiple choice questions as well as written responses, in which the students are given lines to write their answers on. These questions often involve personal connections, the reader's opinion on a topic, and other questions that do not have a definite correct answer. The multiple choice questions are machine-scored while the written responses are scored by professional readers who score it with a 0, 1, or 2, depending on how well the question was answered. The test is divided into 2 sessions (2 passages, 15 questions per session). Each session is 45 minutes long.

Mathematics
The mathematics portion of the CMT assesses students on skills and concepts they are expected to have learned by the time of the test. In grades three and four, there are two test sessions, and in grades five through eight there are three. Each test session is 60 minutes long.

The test consists of three formats: multiple choice, open-ended, and grid-in. 
Multiple choice questions are where students are provided with four possible answers to choose from. 
Open-ended questions require students to explain and show how they got to an answer. There are different rubrics used for scoring depending on the type of open-ended question. 
Grid-in questions (grades five through eight only) require students to write their numerical response in boxes and then fill in corresponding bubbles below each number. All scores are reported by strand, of which there are 25.

Criticism
This test is regarded as 'useless' to most teachers in local high schools, since it shows a student's performance two years prior entering the high school. Other teachers find the data especially useful when used in multiple regression analysis of classroom activities. Data from the CAPT may be regressed on data from classroom spreadsheets after covarying for CMT results. Teachers may then focus on activities which are most closely associated with CAPT performance.

There are also many breaches that have been reported to the head-of-staff that include cell phones ringing, incorrect use of time, and filling in/correcting parts of the test that were either completed prior or have yet to be completed. Most students and teachers regard the essay section of the test as useless, since it gives the impression that it is created to mentally wear students down, rendering them almost incapable to grasp new ideas or concepts for the weeks that the test is administered.

There are many other issues and challenges that arise when administering the CMT's. "English Language Learners (ELL's) present a particular set of challenges, in that teachers must be able to provide instruction for the wide range of language skills that second language learners possess when they enter a classroom”. Teachers face the challenge of designing content instruction that meets both the needs and levels of ELL's. “Many elementary and high school classroom teachers are not familiar with Specifically Designed Academic Instruction in English, a set of strategies that makes the regular curriculum for fluent speakers accessible to those learning the English language” In a study that consisted of 29 participants, researcher Anita Hernandez found that many of the teachers stated that they had very little knowledge of what to do when working with second language learners acquiring English.

While many issues arise when educating such a diverse population, of particular concern is literacy. Currently data from the National Center for Education Statistics for reading, show that 73% of ELL children in the fourth grade score below the “basic” level on standardized assessments, indicating that a significant number did not have at least partial mastery of the skills needed for grade-level work.

The issue of ELL students in the classroom is becoming more of a predominant issue. According to the National Education Association (NEA), the number of ELL students in United States classrooms has increased to five million and doubled in the last fifteen years. The numbers are expected to double again by the year 2015. While 8 out of 10 are Spanish speaking, there are over 100 other languages spoken by other ELL students. The National Education association has been calling on congress to make changes to standardized tests to accommodate this vast majority of students but currently no action has been taken. These students are expected to master content on a standardized test in a language that they cannot fluently speak or read. The pressure is put on teachers to help these students reach unrealistic goals that adversely affects their future success.

See also
Education in the United States

References

Standardized tests in the United States
Education in Connecticut